Propilidium lissocona is a species of sea snail, a true limpet, a marine gastropod mollusk in the family Lepetidae, one of the families of true limpets.

Description

Distribution
Propilidium lissocona can be found between 30.98°N to 25°N and 81°W to 79.64°W at depths of 155 to 538 meters.

References

Lepetidae
Gastropods described in 1927